George William "Bill" Webber (May 2, 1920 – July 10, 2010) was an American Protestant minister, and social activist who served as president of the New York Theological Seminary from 1969 to 1983. In 1948, Webber opened a string of storefront churches starting with a church in East Harlem and developed a program to teach theology to inmates at Sing Sing.

Early life and education
Webber was born on May 2, 1920, in Des Moines, Iowa, where he attended Theodore Roosevelt High School. He earned his undergraduate degree from Harvard University, attending on a basketball scholarship, and enlisted in the United States Navy in 1942. He had originally planned to become a lawyer, but decided to become a minister after thinking during time on his own during long watches as a gunnery officer aboard the USS Breeman (DE-104). After completing his military service he graduated with a Bachelor of Divinity degree from Union Theological Seminary and was awarded a Ph.D. at Columbia University in philosophy of religion. He was ordained as a minister by the United Church of Christ.

Career
In 1948, together with two graduates of Union Theological Seminary he established the East Harlem Protestant Parish, with the goal of leading social change at the local level and serving the needy. This first church led to the formation of additional storefront churches. While many Protestants were moving to the suburbs, Webber moved his family to a housing project in Harlem. Webber was named as President of the New York Theological Seminary in March 1969, an appointment that his predecessor John Sutherland Bonnell opposed, citing concerns that Webber's plan for "radical experimentation" at the school would lead to placing too much focus on social action rather than on evangelism. During his tenure as president of the seminary from 1969 to 1983, Webber doubled the size of the school's enrollment, reaching out to expand attendance by African American, Hispanic and female students. He was awarded an honorary degree from Yale University in 1981, which recognized him as a "prophet for the cause of justice".

In 1974, United States Ambassador to South Vietnam Graham Martin wrote a lengthy letter to Webber, asking him to use his "great influence" with the Viet Cong to convince them to suspend further attacks on civilian targets. Martin publicly blamed Webber as "implicitly responsible" for a mortar attack that resulted in the deaths of 32 South Vietnamese children.

Later life
Webber created a theological training program at Sing Sing prison in Ossining, New York, which had awarded Master of Theology degrees to 350 inmates by the time of Webber's death in 2010. Many of the graduates went on to lead churches and other social service careers, with very few returning to prison. Graduates of the prison program have worked as chaplain's assistants and as counselors, with several pursuing ordination after their release. In a 1993 article in The New York Times, Ari L. Goldman called the program the only one of its kind in the United States.

Death
Webber died at age 90 on July 10, 2010, at his home in Maplewood, New Jersey as a result of complications of Alzheimer's disease. He was survived by his wife, the former Helen Barton, as well as by two daughters, three sons, 11 grandchildren and three great-grandchildren.

Books published
He was the author of three books about his ministry: 
- Total pages: 158 
- Total pages: 160 
- Total pages: 208 
- Total pages: 208

References

1920 births
2010 deaths
American Christian clergy
American Christian theologians
United States Navy personnel of World War II
Deaths from dementia in New Jersey
Deaths from Alzheimer's disease
Harvard University alumni
Writers from Des Moines, Iowa
People from Maplewood, New Jersey
Union Theological Seminary (New York City) alumni
United Church of Christ ministers
Writers from New Jersey
Writers from New York City
United States Navy officers
Theodore Roosevelt High School (Iowa) alumni
Military personnel from New Jersey
Military personnel from Iowa